This article lists the presidents of the Chamber of Citizens of the Federal Assembly of Yugoslavia.

List

See also
Parliament of Serbia and Montenegro#FRY Parliament
List of presidents of the Chamber of Republics of the Federal Assembly of Yugoslavia

Sources
Yugoslav ministries, etc – Rulers.org

Chamber of Citizens, Presidents
Yugoslavia, Chamber of Citizens